Gavin Ernest Hollowell (born November 4, 1997) is an American professional baseball pitcher for the Colorado Rockies of Major League Baseball (MLB).

Amateur career
A native of the Somerset section of Franklin Township, Somerset County, New Jersey, Hollowell attended Montgomery High School and St. John's University. In 2018, he played collegiate summer baseball with the Hyannis Harbor Hawks of the Cape Cod Baseball League.

Professional career
Hollowell was drafted by the Colorado Rockies in the sixth round of the 2019 MLB draft.

He was called up to the majors for the first time on September 18, 2022.

References

External links

1997 births
Living people
Montgomery High School (New Jersey) alumni
Sportspeople from Franklin Township, Somerset County, New Jersey
Baseball players from New Jersey
Major League Baseball pitchers
Colorado Rockies players
St. John's Red Storm baseball players
Hyannis Harbor Hawks players
Grand Junction Rockies players
Arizona Complex League Rockies players
Fresno Grizzlies players
Hartford Yard Goats players